Take Me All the Way is the eighth album by Stacy Lattisaw, released in 1986 on Motown Records. This album features the song, "Nail It To The Wall".

Track listing with credits

Side A
"Jump Into My Life" (Kashif, Paul Gurvitz)	4:17
Backing Vocals – Audrey Wheeler, Larry Smith, Cindy Mizelle
Arranged By [Backing Vocals], Keyboards, Producer, Synthesizer – Kashif
Drum Programming, Associate Producer, Synthesizer – Paul Gurvitz
Guitar – Ira Siegel
Percussion – Bashiri Johnson
Associate Producer, Synthesizer [Ox-1] – Jeff Smith
"The Hard Way" (Doug James, Sue Schifrin)	3:33
Arranged By, Drum Programming, Keyboards, Synthesizer – Jim Lang
Arranged By, Guitar [Additional], Producer, Synthesizer [Additional] – Tony Peluso
Backing Vocals – Alex Brown, Brenda Lee Eager, Ivory Stone, Julia Tillman Waters, Maxine Willard Waters, Patricia Henley
Drums [Augmentation] – Fred Alwag
Producer – Steve Barri
Soloist, Lyricon – Richard Elliot
"Take Me All the Way" (Narada Michael Walden, Preston Glass)	4:14
Arranged By, Drum Programming, Percussion, Producer  – Narada Michael Walden
Backing Vocals – Claytoven Richardson, Jeanie Tracy, Karen Brewington
Bass – Randy Jackson
Guitar – Corrado Rustici
Additional Keyboards – Walter Afanasieff
Keyboards – Preston Glass
"A Little Bit of Heaven" (Arnie Roman, Stephen Broughton Lunt)	3:55
Arranged By, Additional Keyboards, Producer – Tony Peluso
Arranged By, Keyboards, Synthesizer – John Hobbs
Backing Vocals – Alex Brown, Julia Tillman Waters, Maxine Willard Waters
Bass – Joe Chemay
Drums – Paul Leim
Guitar – Dann Huff
Additional Keyboards – Jim Lang
Percussion – Paulinho Da Costa
Producer – Steve Barri
Synclavier – Dale Echnoz
Soloist, Lyricon – Richard Elliot
"Longshot" (Alan Roy Scott, Gary Pickus)	4:32
Arranged By, Keyboards, Synthesizer – John Hobbs
Backing Vocals – Alex Brown, Julia Tillman Waters, Maxine Willard Waters
Bass – Joe Chemay
Drums – Paul Leim
Guitar [Fills], Producer – Tony Peluso
Producer – Steve Barri
Synclavier – Craig Harris
Rhythm Guitar – Dann Huff

Side B
"Nail It to the Wall" (Arnie Roman, Stephen Broughton Lunt)	4:42
Arranged By, Backing Vocals, Drums, Producer – Jellybean
Arranged By, Percussion, Synthesizer – Fred Zarr
Backing Vocals – Audrey Wheeler, Louie Vega, Wendell Morrison
Percussion – Bashiri Johnson
Saxophone – Jeff Smith
Vocoder – Stephen Bray
"Love Me Like the First Time" (Frank Wildhorn, Gary Benson)	3:25
Arranged By, Keyboards, Synthesizer – John Hobbs
Bass – Joe Chemay
Drums – Paul Leim
Guitar [Fills], Producer – Tony Peluso
Producer – Steve Barri
Synclavier – Dale Echnoz
Rhythm Guitar – Dann Huff
"You Ain't Leavin'" (Bob Garrett, Jack Conrad)	3:48
Arranged By, Bass, Drum Programming, Producer – Leon F. Sylvers III
Arranged By, Keyboards – Joey Gallo
Backing Vocals – Angie Sylvers, Charmaine Sylvers, Edmund Sylvers
Keyboards – William Bryant III
Soloist, Saxophone – Scott Roewe
"Over the Top" (Alan Gorrie, Jeff Bova, Michael Mugrage)	4:25
Arranged By, Drum Programming, Keyboards, Synthesizer – Jim Lang
Arranged By, Producer, Additional Synthesizer – Tony Peluso
Backing Vocals – Brenda Lee Eager, Ivory Stone, Patricia Henley
Drums [Augmentation] – Fred Alwag
Guitar – Paul Jackson, Jr.
Lyricon [Solo] – Richard Elliot
Percussion – Paulinho Da Costa
Additional Percussion, Producer – Steve Barri
"One More Night" (Brian Potter, Frank Wildhorn)	3:43
Backing Vocals – Audrey Wheeler, Cindy Mizelle, Shelly Scruggs
Co-producer, Drum Programming, Programmed By [Ox-1], Synthesizer – Shelly Scruggs
Co-producer, Bass, Keyboards, Synthesizer [Rx-11] – Brian Morgan
Guitar – Ira Siegel
Percussion – Bashiri Johnson
Producer – Kashif

External links
Take Me All the Way by Stacy Lattisaw at MusicBrainz
Take Me All the Way by Stacy Lattisaw at Discogs

1986 albums
Stacy Lattisaw albums
albums produced by Narada Michael Walden
Motown albums